Eressa eressoides is a moth of the family Erebidae. It was described by George Hampson in 1893. It is found in Myanmar.

References

 

Eressa
Moths described in 1893